Andrei Mihailov (born October 31, 1980) is a Moldovan former swimmer, who specialized in backstroke events. He is a two-time Olympian (2000 and 2004) and a member of the Moldova Swimming Team.

Mihailov's Olympic debut came at the 2000 Summer Olympics in Sydney. Swimming in heat one of the men's 200 m backstroke, he edged out Bulgaria's Ivan Angelov to take a second spot and thirty-eighth overall by 0.63 of a second in 2:06.67.

At the 2004 Summer Olympics in Athens, Mihailov qualified again for the 200 m backstroke. He cleared a FINA B-standard entry time of 2:06.12 from the Russian Open Championships in Moscow. Swimming in the same heat as Sydney, he raced again to second place by 0.68 of a second behind Finland's Matti Mäki in 2:06.97. Mihailov failed to advance into the semifinals, as he placed thirty-fourth overall in the preliminaries.

References

1980 births
Living people
Moldovan male backstroke swimmers
Olympic swimmers of Moldova
Swimmers at the 2000 Summer Olympics
Swimmers at the 2004 Summer Olympics
People from Tiraspol